The Communauté d'agglomération Arles-Crau-Camargue-Montagnette (CCAM) is the communauté d'agglomération, an intercommunal structure, centred on the city of Arles. It is located in the Bouches-du-Rhône department, in the Provence-Alpes-Côte d'Azur region, southeastern France. It was created in December 2003. Its area is 1445.8 km2. Its population was 83,669 in 2018, of which 51,031 in Arles proper.

Composition
The communauté d'agglomération consists of the following 6 communes:
Arles
Boulbon
Saintes-Maries-de-la-Mer
Saint-Martin-de-Crau
Saint-Pierre-de-Mézoargues
Tarascon

See also
 Crau
 Camargue

References

External links
Official Website

Arles-Crau-Camargue-Montagnette
Arles-Crau-Camargue-Montagnette